Drag Harlan is a 1920 American silent Western film produced and released by the Fox Film Corporation and directed by J. Gordon Edwards. The film is based on an original story for the screen and stars William Farnum along with Jackie Saunders as leading lady.

This film survives in a highly contrasted but complete print at the Library of Congress. It was available on VHS from Grapevine video briefly in the 1990s.

Plot
As described in a film magazine, Drag Harlan (Farnum) comes upon Lane Morgan (Mayall) dying as a result of an attack by Deveny's gang, who are after his gold mine. After Drag promises to protect Lane's daughter, Lane dies. Appearing on the Morgan ranch, Drag is challenged by John Haydon (Millett). After identification of some watch chain found in the dead man's hand, John is proven to be the murderer. Harlan quickly escapes a near killing and rescues the kidnapped Barbara Morgan (Saunders), restores peace in general, and wins her heart.

Cast 
 William Farnum as Drag Harlan
 Jackie Saunders as Barbara Morgan
 Arthur Millett as John Haydon
 G. Raymond Nye as Luke Deveny
 Herschel Mayall as Lane Morgan
 Frank Thorwald as Meeker Lawson
 Kewpie Morgan as Red Linton
 Al Fremont as Laskar
 Earl Crain as Storm Rogers (credited as Erle Crain)

References

External links 

 
 
 Drag Harlan lantern slide(Wayback Machine)

1920 films
Fox Film films
Films based on short fiction
Films directed by J. Gordon Edwards
1920 Western (genre) films
American black-and-white films
Silent American Western (genre) films
1920s American films
1920s English-language films